Cannabis in Slovakia is illegal for all purposes and possession of even small amounts of the drug can lead to lengthy prison terms. Possession or use of small amounts of cannabis (or only 1 joint) is punishable by up to eight years in prison. In April 2012, The Wall Street Journal reported that Robert Fico, the incoming Slovak prime minister, might push for partial legalisation of cannabis possession, and has argued for the legalisation of possession of up to three doses of cannabis for personal use.

Proposed reform
In February 2018, The partial decriminalization of drugs was once proposed by the former Minister of Justice Lucia Žitňanská."For the first time, possession of a small amount of a drug should be punished as a misdemeanor and only in the case of repeated violations of the law within 12 months as a criminal offense. Under the age of 18, in addition to a fine, medical diagnosis, social counseling and, where appropriate, drug treatment should be automatically ordered". The strongest government party (SMER-SD) did not like the decriminalization of hard drugs. Žitňanská proposed that the breach limit be reduced for marijuana (1 grams), cocaine (0.2 grams), methamphetamine (0.2 grams), heroin (0.5 grams) or 3 ecstasy tablets (0.8 grams).

In the coalition, however, her proposal did not pass at that time, nor did it succeed in enforcing a slightly more conservative proposal by its successor, Gábor Gál. In both cases, the SNS was against the proposals. The SNS coalition party refuses to support the law at the government meeting. Because, in their words: "Demand for drugs will increase."

Legalization of CBD

9 October 2019 

According to its authors, the law will be designed to increase social protection and prevent the occurrence of addiction to narcotics and psychotropic substances, including the prevention of treatment of health consequences of persons dependent on the use of these substances by making criminal sanctions more flexible. Illicit activities of entities involved in the illicit manufacture and sale of narcotic drugs and psychotropic substances.

However, it will remain on this list once Members have decided cannabidiol (CBD) remains on the list of narcotic and psychotropic substances. Amendment by Jozef Valocký (Smer-SD) was approved by the members of the Parliamentary Health Committee at their meeting on Wednesday 09. October 2019.

27 of the 28 countries in the European Union do not consider cannabidiol (CBD) cannabis extract as a dangerous substance and have no need to control it in any way. Slovakia is the only exception that continues.

17 July 2020 

After the parliamentary elections, The Ministry of Health wants to remove cannabidiol (CBD) from the list of psychotropic substances. This follows from the preliminary information of the Ministry on the planned amendment of the Act on Narcotic Substances, Psychotropic Substances and Preparations.

"The expert committee of the World Health Organization considers it harmless and does not cause addiction and this substance is not included in the list even according to UN conventions," the ministry clarified in the material.

The aim of the legislative change is also to extend the control mechanisms required by international UN conventions and to bring the law into line with European Union law. At the same time, several narcotic and psychotropic substances are to be added to the list. The expected date of commencement of the comment procedure is August 2020.

The ministry proposed removing cannabidiol from the list last year. However, MEPs supported the amendment by Jozef Valocký (Smer-SD) and remained on the list.

In February 2020, MEPs called on EU member states to make full use of the potential of marijuana-based medicines and remove obstacles to further scientific research in this area. Legislation on the therapeutic use of cannabis varies from one Member State to another.

The World Health Organization (WHO) has officially recommended that cannabidiol, a constituent of cannabis, not be included in the list of internationally controlled substances.

Commentary
Slovak penalties for marijuana are immoral (28. February 2023)

The court released Mr. Juraj Hossu conditionally. He murdered a man on the street. On the other hand, the Trnava "hemp ointment man" got 16 years. This is a strange disproportion...

The criminal law is supposed to punish actions that cause social damage. Does the personal consumption of marijuana cause social harm? This is certainly less damage than smoking cigarettes, drinking alcohol or an unhealthy lifestyle.

Opponents of marijuana decriminalization theorize about a "gateway" to hard drugs. You start with marijuana and end up as a heroin addict. The largest study has shown that this is nonsense and that there was no increase in the abuse of illegal drugs after the legalization of marijuana. Marijuana helps relieve pain without serious side effects, unlike legal opiates. Opponents of marijuana also argue that you get "just probation" for a first marijuana offense. We could statistically confirm that even violent alcoholics started with a small beer. But this argument probably won't help anyone...

And when even the opponents of marijuana themselves know that they are wrong, they close the whole topic by saying that "there is no political will". In other words, there are more of us and therefore there will be no change. It is true that parliamentary power is exercised by the parliamentary majority. However, criminal law should not refer only to the majority. In addition to the majority, it is also supposed to protect the minority. There is no doubt that the Slovak criminal law on cannabis grossly violates basic human rights.

References

Slovakia
Politics of Slovakia
Society of Slovakia